In the United States, the Federal Food, Drug, and Cosmetic Act defined the word "drug" as an "article intended for use in the diagnosis, cure, mitigation, treatment, or prevention of disease in man or other animals" and those "(other than food) intended to affect the structure or any function of the body of man or other animals." Consistent with that definition, the U.S. separately defines narcotic drugs and controlled substances, which may include non-drugs, and explicitly excludes tobacco, caffeine and alcoholic beverages.

Federal drug policy

History of United States drug prohibition
Office of National Drug Control Policy
Drug Enforcement Administration

War on drugs

The War on drugs is a campaign of prohibition and foreign military aid and military intervention undertaken by the United States government, with the assistance of participating countries, and the stated aim to define and reduce the illegal drug trade. This initiative includes a set of drug policies of the United States that are intended to discourage the production, distribution, and consumption of illegal psychoactive drugs. The term "War on Drugs" was first used by President Richard Nixon in 1971.

Drug courts

The first Drug court in the United States took shape in Miami-Dade County, Florida in 1989 as a response to the growing crack-cocaine usage in the city. Chief Judge Gerald Wetherington, Judge Herbert Klein, then State Attorney Janet Reno and Public Defender Bennett Brummer designed the court for nonviolent offenders to receive treatment. This model of court system quickly became a popular method for dealing with an ever increasing number of drug offenders. Between 1984 and 1999, the number of defendants charged with a drug offense in the Federal courts increased 3% annually, from 11,854 to 29,306. By 1999 there were 472 Drug Courts in the nation and by 2005 that number had increased to 1262 with another 575 Drug Courts in the planning stages; currently all 50 states have working Drug Courts. There are currently about 120,000 people treated annually in Drug Courts, though an estimated 1.5 million eligible people are currently before the courts. There are currently more than 2,400 Drug Courts operating throughout the United States.

Pharmacological drugs
Pharmacies in the United States
Prescription drug prices in the United States
National Drug Code

Doping in sports

Doping is the taking of performance-enhancing drugs, generally for sporting activities. Doping has been detected in many sporting codes, especially baseball and football.

Recreational drugs by type

Alcohol

Prohibition in the United States
Alcohol consumption by youth in the United States
Alcohol-related traffic crashes in the United States

Cannabis

Medical cannabis in the United States
Decriminalization of non-medical cannabis in the United States
Legal history of cannabis in the United States
Removal of cannabis from Schedule I of the Controlled Substances Act

Cocaine

Methamphetamine

Psilocybin

Tobacco

History of commercial tobacco in the United States
Cigarette taxes in the United States

Drug use and deaths per state

See also
Illegal drug trade in the United States
Opioid epidemic in the United States
Drug prohibition
Crime in the United States
National Institute on Drug Abuse

References

Further reading